Jean Gagé (1 June 1902 – 4 May 1986) was a French historian who specialised in ancient Roman history.

From 1921 to 1924, Jean Gagé was a student at the École normale supérieure in Paris and obtained his agrégation de lettres. He was a member of the École française de Rome from 1925 until 1928, years in which he participated in excavations in Algeria. He was sent to a teaching assignment in São Paulo, where he remained during World War II. He returned to France in 1945 and settled in Strasbourg. In 1955, he defended his thesis at the Sorbonne, then was appointed a professor at the Collège de France, succeeding André Piganiol as the chair of Roman civilisation, where he taught until 1972.

Selected works 
1964: Les Classes sociales dans l'Empire romain - Payot
1965: La Montée des Perses Sassanides et l'heure de Palmyre - Albin Michel
1976: La Chute des Tarquins et les débuts de la République romaine - Payot

External links 
 Jean Gagé on the site of the Académie Française
 Biography
 Matronalla. Essai sur les dévotions et les organisations culturelles des femmes dans l'ancienne Rome by Jean Gagé on Persée

Winners of the Prix Broquette-Gonin (literature)
20th-century French historians
French scholars of Roman history
Academic staff of the Collège de France
École Normale Supérieure alumni
1902 births
1986 deaths